Silverstar is a 2022 Dutch film directed by Diede in 't Veld. The film won the Golden Film award after having sold 100,000 tickets. The film is the sequel to the 2019 film Whitestar.

Principal photography began in August 2021. Britt Dekker and Juvat Westendorp play roles in the film.

It was the 15th best visited Dutch film of 2022 with just over 97,000 visitors.

References

External links 
 

2022 films
2020s Dutch-language films
Films shot in the Netherlands
Dutch sequel films